Suphisara Konlak (born January 18, 1996), best known professionally as Loma Lookboonmee, is a Thai martial artist who has competed in Muay Thai, boxing, kickboxing, and mixed martial arts. In boxing she has fought under the names Kanda Por Muangpetch and Kanda Kokietgym. She is currently signed to the Ultimate Fighting Championship, being the first Thai fighter to sign with the organization.

Career

Early career
Lookboonmee began training Muay Thai at seven years old at her father Boonmee Suphisara's gym. She began competing against girls, but soon was facing boys due to the lack of competition. She eventually gained several titles and competed for the Thai national team.

Lookboonmee transitioned to mixed martial arts in 2017, training under coach George Hickman at Tiger Muay Thai. She made her amateur debut for Thailand Fighting Championship at the music/MMA festival event RockWars on September 23. She won the bout, submitting Filipina fighter Krisna Limbaga by rear naked choke in the second round, after which she quickly turned pro, signing with Invicta Fighting Championships in October. She made her professional debut in January 2018 at Invicta FC 27. She amassed a record of three wins against one loss before going to the UFC.

Ultimate Fighting Championship
In September 2019, it was announced that Lookboonmee had signed with the UFC. She made her debut against Aleksandra Albu at UFC on ESPN+ 20. She won the fight via split decision.

Lookboonmee was scheduled to face Hannah Goldy on February 23, 2020 at UFC Fight Night 168. However, Goldy pulled out due to a shoulder injury and was replaced by Angela Hill. She lost the fight via unanimous decision.

Lookboonmee faced Jinh Yu Frey on October 4, 2020 at UFC on ESPN: Holm vs. Aldana.  She won the fight via unanimous decision.

As the first bout of her new multi-fight contract, Lookboonmee faced Sam Hughes on May 1, 2021 at UFC on ESPN: Reyes vs. Procházka. She won the bout via unanimous decision.

Lookboonmee was scheduled to face Cheyanne Buys on November 20, 2021 at UFC Fight Night 198. However, Buys withdrew from the bout for undisclosed reasons and she was replaced by Lupita Godinez. She lost the bout via unanimous decision.

Lookboonmee was scheduled to face Diana Belbiţă on September 17, 2022 at UFC Fight Night 210. However, Belbiţă withdraw due to undisclosed reason and was replaced by Denise Gomes. Lookboonmee won the fight via unanimous decision.

As the first bout of her new multi-fight contract, Lookboonmee was scheduled to face Elise Reed on February 4, 2023, at UFC Fight Night 218.  However, the pair was moved to 
UFC 284 for undisclosed reasons. She won the fight via a rear-naked choke submission in the second round.

Championships and achievements

Mixed martial arts
Invicta Fighting Championships
Fight of the Night (one time) vs. Monique Adriane

Muay Thai
Onesongchai
 2012 S-1 World -100 lbs Champion
International Federation of Muaythai Associations
 2015 I.F.M.A. World Championship -45 kg Champion
 2016 I.F.M.A. World Championship -45 kg runner-up
 2017 I.F.M.A. World Championship -48 kg champion
 2018 I.F.M.A. World Championship -48 kg champion
 2019 I.F.M.A. World Championship -48 kg second runner up

Mixed martial arts record

|-
|Win
|align=center|8–3
|Elise Reed
|Submission (rear-naked choke)
|UFC 284
| 
|align=center|2
|align=center|0:44
|Perth, Australia 
|
|-
|Win
|align=center|7–3
|Denise Gomes
|Decision (unanimous)
|UFC Fight Night: Sandhagen vs. Song 
|
|align=center|3
|align=center|5:00
|Las Vegas, Nevada, United States
|
|-
|Loss
|align=center|6–3
|Lupita Godinez
|Decision (unanimous)
|UFC Fight Night: Vieira vs. Tate
|
|align=center|3
|align=center|5:00
|Las Vegas, Nevada, United States
|
|-
|Win
|align=center|6–2
|Sam Hughes
|Decision (unanimous)
|UFC on ESPN: Reyes vs. Procházka 
|
|align=center|3
|align=center|5:00
|Las Vegas, Nevada, United States
|
|-
|Win
|align=center|5–2
|Jinh Yu Frey
|Decision (unanimous)
|UFC on ESPN: Holm vs. Aldana 
|
|align=center|3
|align=center|5:00
|Abu Dhabi, United Arab Emirates
|  
|-
|Loss
|align=center|4–2
|Angela Hill
|Decision (unanimous)
|UFC Fight Night: Felder vs. Hooker 
|
|align=center|3
|align=center|5:00
|Auckland, New Zealand
|
|-
|Win
|align=center|4–1
|Aleksandra Albu
|Decision (split)
|UFC Fight Night: Maia vs. Askren
|
|align=center|3
|align=center|5:00
|Kallang, Singapore
|
|-
|Win
|align=center|3–1
|Monique Adriane
|Decision (unanimous)
|Invicta FC 35: Bennett vs. Rodriguez II
|
|align=center|3
|align=center|5:00
|Kansas City, Kansas, United States
|
|-
|Loss
|align=center|2–1
|Suwanan Boonsorn
|Submission (armbar)
|Full Metal Dojo 16: Big Trouble in Little Bangkok
|
|align=center|1
|align=center|2:06
|Bangkok, Thailand
|
|-
|Win
|align=center|2–0
|Hana Date
|TKO (elbow)
|Pancrase 298
|
|align=center|2
|align=center|4:32
|Tokyo, Japan
|
|-
|Win
|align=center|1–0
|Melissa Wang
|Decision (unanimous)
|Invicta FC 27: Kaufman vs. Kianzad
|
|align=center|3
|align=center|5:00
|Kansas City, Missouri, United States
|
|-

|-
|Win
|align=center|1–0
|Krisna Limbaga
|Submission (rear-naked choke)
|RockWars Pattaya
|
|align=center|2
|align=center|2:13
|Pattaya, Thailand
|
|-

Muay Thai record

|-  bgcolor="#cfc"
| 2016-08-12|| Win||align=left| Sylvie Petchrungruang || Road to Abu Dhabi || Bangkok, Thailand || Decision || 3 || 3:00
|-  bgcolor="#cfc"
| 2016-07-09|| Win||align=left| Kim Townsend || Epic Fight Promotions 15: Pride || Perth, Australia || Decision (Unanimous) || 5 || 2:00
|-  bgcolor="#cfc"
| 2016-04-|| Win||align=left| Phetnaree Phetsakchai||  ||  Thailand || Decision  || 5 || 2:00
|-  bgcolor="#cfc"
| 2015-12-19|| Win||align=left| Sylvie Petchrungruang ||  || Hua Hin, Thailand || Decision || 5 || 2:00
|-  bgcolor="#cfc"
| 2015-04-19|| Win||align=left| Sylvie Petchrungruang || Songkran Show || Bang Saray, Thailand || Decision || 5 || 2:00
|-  bgcolor="#cfc"
| 2015-02-15|| Win||align=left| Sylvie Petchrungruang || Pakthongchai Show || Khorat, Thailand || Decision || 5 || 2:00
|-  bgcolor="#fbb"
| 2013-07- || Loss ||align=left| Denise Castle|| Muaythai World Series UK vs Thailand|| United Kingdom ||Decision (Unanimous) || 5 || 2:00 
|-
! style=background:white colspan=9 |
|-  bgcolor="#cfc"
| 2012-12-05 || Win||align=left| Denise Castle|| King's Birthday|| Bangkok, Thailand ||Decision  || 5 || 2:00 
|-
! style=background:white colspan=9 |
|-  bgcolor="#fbb"
| 2012-12-02 || Loss ||align=left| Erika Kamimura || RISE/M-1 ~Infinity~ || Tokyo, Japan ||KO (Right Straight) || 3 || 1:21 
|-
! style=background:white colspan=9 |
|-
| colspan=9 | Legend:    

|-  style="background:#fbb;"
| 2019-07-27|| Loss||align=left| Sze Sze Rowlinson || 2019 IFMA World Championship, Semi Final|| Bangkok, Thailand || Decision  || 3 || 3:00
|-
! style=background:white colspan=9 |
|-  style="background:#cfc;"
| 2019-07-25|| Win||align=left| Vera Buga || 2019 IFMA World Championship, Quarter Final|| Bangkok, Thailand || Decision  || 3 || 3:00
|-  style="background:#cfc;"
| 2019-07-24|| Win||align=left| Jessica Petterson || 2019 IFMA World Championship, Round of 16|| Bangkok, Thailand || Decision  || 3 || 3:00
|-  style="background:#cfc;"
| 2018-05-19|| Win||align=left| Vera Buga || 2018 IFMA World Championship, Final|| Cancun, Mexico || Decision  || 3 || 3:00
|-
! style=background:white colspan=9 |
|-  style="background:#cfc;"
| 2018-05-18|| Win||align=left| Myriame Djedidi || 2018 IFMA World Championship, Semi Final|| Cancun, Mexico || Decision  || 3 || 3:00
|-  style="background:#cfc;"
| 2018-05-14|| Win||align=left| Cheryl Gwa|| 2018 IFMA World Championship, Quarter Final|| Cancun, Mexico || Decision  || 3 || 3:00
|-  style="background:#cfc;"
| 2018-05-13|| Win||align=left| Lucie Aubrechtova|| 2018 IFMA World Championship, Round of 16|| Cancun, Mexico || Decision  || 3 || 3:00
|-  style="background:#cfc;"
| 2017-05-12|| Win||align=left| Liudmila Chyslova || 2017 IFMA World Championship, Final|| Minsk, Belarus || Decision  || 3 || 3:00
|-
! style=background:white colspan=9 |
|-  style="background:#cfc;"
| 2017-05-08|| Win||align=left| Meriame Mahfoud || 2017 IFMA World Championship, Semi Final|| Minsk, Belarus || Decision  || 3 || 3:00
|-  style="background:#cfc;"
| 2017-05-07|| Win||align=left| Vera Buga || 2017 IFMA World Championship, Quarter Final|| Minsk, Belarus || Decision  || 3 || 3:00
|-  style="background:#cfc;"
| 2016-09-|| Win||align=left| Wu Hoi Yan || 2016 Asian Beach Games, Final|| Da Nang, Vietnam || Decision  || 3 || 3:00
|-
! style=background:white colspan=9 |
|-  style="background:#cfc;"
| 2016-09-|| Win||align=left|  || 2016 Asian Beach Games, Semi Final|| Da Nang, Vietnam || Decision  || 3 || 3:00
|-  style="background:#fbb;"
| 2016-05-28|| Loss ||align=left| Alena Liashkevich|| 2016 IFMA World Championship, Final|| Jönköping, Sweden || Decision  || 3 || 3:00
|-
! style=background:white colspan=9 |
|-  style="background:#cfc;"
| 2016-05-26|| Win||align=left| Vera Megodina|| 2016 IFMA World Championship, Semi Final|| Jönköping, Sweden || Decision  || 3 || 3:00
|-  style="background:#cfc;"
| 2015-08-20|| Win||align=left| Alena Liashkevich || 2015 IFMA World Championship, Final|| Bangkok, Thailand || Decision  || 3 || 3:00
|-
! style=background:white colspan=9 |
|-  style="background:#cfc;"
| 2015-08-19|| Win||align=left| Pia Urpulahti || 2015 IFMA World Championship, Semi Final|| Bangkok, Thailand || Decision  || 3 || 3:00
|-  style="background:#cfc;"
| 2015-08-16|| Win||align=left| Wu Hoi Yan || 2015 IFMA World Championship, Quarter Final|| Bangkok, Thailand || Decision  || 3 || 3:00
|-
| colspan=9 | Legend:

Professional boxing record

See also
 List of current UFC fighters
 List of female mixed martial artists

References

External links
 
 

1996 births
Living people
Loma Lookboonmee
Loma Lookboonmee
Loma Lookboonmee
Female Brazilian jiu-jitsu practitioners
Loma Lookboonmee
Atomweight mixed martial artists
Strawweight mixed martial artists
Mixed martial artists utilizing Muay Thai
Mixed martial artists utilizing boxing
Mixed martial artists utilizing Brazilian jiu-jitsu
Ultimate Fighting Championship female fighters
Loma Lookboonmee
Loma Lookboonmee